Quadron is the first studio album by Danish soul pop duo Quadron.

Track listing

References

2009 debut albums
Quadron albums